Concrete Jungle, released in 2010, is the third album by Nigerian-German singer-songwriter Nneka - the album was her first US release.

Track listing

Charts

Album

Singles

References 

2010 albums
Igbo-language albums
Nneka (singer) albums
Decon albums